Duzakh Darreh (also Romanized as Dūzakh Darreh; also known as Dūzakhdarreh) is a village in Esfandaqeh Rural District, in the Central District of Jiroft County, Kerman Province, Iran. At the 2006 census, its population was 80, in 18 families.

References 

Populated places in Jiroft County